Verkhnyaya Kurmaza (Ürge Körmäźe) is a rural locality (a selo) in Bizhbulyaksky Selsoviet, Bizhbulyaksky District, Bashkortostan, Russia. The population was 53 as of 2010. There are 3 streets.

Geography 
Verkhnyaya Kurmaza is located 9 km south of Bizhbulyak (the district's administrative centre) by road. Ibraykino is the nearest rural locality.

References 

Rural localities in Bizhbulyaksky District